A. F. Molamure may refer to:
 
Alexander Francis Molamure, Speaker of parliament 
Alexander Francis Molamure Jr, Ceylonese politician